Tony Buck (born 1962) is an Australian drummer and percussionist. He graduated from the New South Wales Conservatorium of Music (now Sydney Conservatorium of Music), becoming involved in the Australian jazz scene.

Buck played in Great White Noise with Michael Sheridan and Sandy Evans during 1983, then Women and Children First with Sandy Evans. He is a founding member of The Necks with Chris Abrahams and Lloyd Swanton since 1987. He is leader of Peril, who he formed in Japan with Otomo Yoshihide and Kato Hideki, and astroPeril.  He also formed the short lived L'Beato in the early 1990s, an industrial-oriented outfit reminiscent of Tackhead, which released one EP "The Piston Song".

In the early 1990s, Buck moved from Australia to Amsterdam and later moved to Berlin.

Discography 
The Shape of Things to Come (1989)
Solo Live (1994)
Self_contained_underwater_breathing_apparatus
Projekt Transmit (2009)
Knoxville (Christian Fennesz / David Daniell / Tony Buck, 2010)
Flatbosc & Cautery (Frank Gratkowski, Achim Kaufmann, Wilbert De Joode, Tony Buck, NoBusiness 2020)

See also 
 The Necks

Awards and nominations

APRA Awards
The APRA Awards are presented annually from 1982 by the Australasian Performing Right Association (APRA).

|-
| 2005 ||  "Drive By" (with Chris Abrahams and Lloyd Swanton) || Most Performed Jazz Work || 
|-
| 2006 ||  "Chemist" (with Abrahams and Swanton) || Most Performed Jazz Work || 
|-
| 2019
| "Body" (with Abrahams and Swanton)
| Song of the Year
| 
|-

References

General
  Note: Archived [on-line] copy has limited functionality.
  Note: [on-line] version established at White Room Electronic Publishing Pty Ltd in 2007 and was expanded from the 2002 edition.

Specific

External links
 Tony Buck discography at Discogs 

1962 births
Living people
APRA Award winners
Australian jazz drummers
Male drummers
Sydney Conservatorium of Music alumni
Musicians from Sydney
Male jazz musicians
The Necks members
Peril (band) members
NoBusiness Records artists